The Men's team pursuit was held on 19 October 2012. 8 nations participated.

Medalists

Results
Fastest 2 teams raced for gold and 3rd and 4th teams raced for bronze.

Qualifying
It was held at 13:35.

Finals
The finals were held at 19:45.

References

Men's team pursuit
European Track Championships – Men's team pursuit